List of Guggenheim Fellowships awarded in 1997.

References

1997
1997 awards